Dabl is an American lifestyle-oriented digital multicast television network owned by the CBS Media Ventures subsidiary of Paramount Global.

The company's formerly-owned other subchannel network, Decades, through CBS News and Stations was launched in 2014 with Weigel Broadcasting. The network was the first CBS-owned property that has its operations built and operated using cloud computing, and is transmitting through CBS's media operations platform, which utilizes both automation and cloud-enabled technology.

History
In June 2019, CBS Television Distribution (now known as CBS Media Ventures) announced that it would launch DABL, a life style broadcasting network. The network will be carried on CBS owned and operated stations covering 39% of the population and had agreements giving the network over 70% coverage as of the announcement. To add to CBS library of daytime talk, court and informational programming, CBS acquired Martha Stewart and Emeril Lagasse programming to round out the network's schedule. Prior, CBS stations were slow to add additional subchannels since the 2009 digital transition. Dabl followed two ad supported streaming services from CBS, CBS Sports HQ and ET Live. Deadline.com sees Dabl's launch occurring in a multicast network "boom time" as these network operation on low cost with library-based programming with "sizeable ratings".

Dabl launched on September 9, 2019 having an expected 80% coverage as of August 27, 2019.

Programming
Programming on the channel includes:

60 Minute Makeover
Animal Rescue
Cesar 911
Cesar Millan's Leader of the Pack
Culinary Genius
Dabl at Home
Design Inc.
Dirty Business
Disaster Decks
Dog Tales
Emeril Live
Escape to the Country
Essence of Emeril
Extreme Makeover: Home Edition
Find & Design
Flip This House
Flipping Boston
Flipping San Diego
From Martha's Garden
Gordon Ramsay's Home Cooking
Gordon Ramsay's Ultimate Cookery Course
Home Again with Bob Vila
House Doctor
How Clean Is Your House?
Instant Gardener
Jamie's 15-Minute Meals
Jamie's 30-Minute Meals
Jamie's Food Escapes
Kitchen Nightmares
Lucky Dog
Martha Stewart Living
Nanny 911
Pick a Puppy
Real Potential
Reno vs. Relocate
Rich Bride Poor Bride
Room Service
Sarah 101
Sell This House
Selling Houses with Amanda Lamb
Undercover Boss
Wild Discoveries at the San Diego Zoo
Wild Stories at the San Diego Zoo
Wild Times at the San Diego Zoo
Wild Treks at the San Diego Zoo
You Deserve This House
You Gotta Eat Here!
Yum

Affiliates

Outside of the CBS News and Stations (owned and operated), the network is offered to affiliates on a case-by-case basis one of revenue-sharing, a license fee or leasing. Dabl's partner stations include stations from the station groups of CBS News and Stations, Bahakel Communications, Capitol Broadcasting Company, Graham Media Group, Meredith Corporation, News-Press & Gazette Company, Gray Television, Sinclair Broadcast Group, Nexstar Media Group and Univision Communications. It is also carried by the Paramount Global free streaming service Pluto TV, on its channel 614.

References

External links
 

Television networks in the United States
English-language television stations in the United States
Television channels and stations established in 2019
CBS Media Ventures
CBS Television Network
Gardening television
Food and drink television
Home improvement
Women's interest channels
2019 establishments in the United States